Mid-Town Historic District is state and federal historic district in the central business district of Elizabeth, in Union County, New Jersey. It encompasses
2-210 and 1-233 Broad St.; 251-339 North Broad Street; 1190-1214 and 1201-1217 East Grand St.; 1125-1169 and 1140-1170 East Jersey Street, and parts of Dickinson Street, Commerce Place, Elizabeth Avenue, and Martin Luther King Plaza. Contributing properties include the Elizabeth Public Library, the Ritz Theatre and the individually listed First Presbyterian Church of Elizabeth.

Buildings
Elizabeth is the fourth largest city by population in New Jersey and the seat of Union County. Located 5 miles south of Newark, Elizabeth has never developed a sizeable skyline, though mid-rises built before and during the Great Depression characterize the Mid-Town Historic District in the core of the city's central business district.

See also
Belcher-Ogden Mansion-Price, Benjamin-Price-Brittan Houses District
National Register of Historic Places listings in Union County, New Jersey
Midtown Station
Thomas Jefferson Arts Academy

References 

Geography of Elizabeth, New Jersey
Historic districts in Union County, New Jersey
National Register of Historic Places in Union County, New Jersey
New Jersey Register of Historic Places
Historic districts on the National Register of Historic Places in New Jersey